Box's Shop is a hamlet in the civil parish of Poundstock in north Cornwall, England, United Kingdom. It consists of several cottages, farms and holiday accommodation centred on a crossroads known as 'Box's Shop'. The crossroads is one mile (1.6 km) east of Widemouth Bay on the A39 'Atlantic Highway' road.

References

External links

Hamlets in Cornwall